The final of the Women's 100 metres Hurdles event at the 2003 Pan American Games took place on Saturday August 9, 2003, with the heats staged a day earlier. Jamaica's Brigitte Foster-Hylton set a new Pan Am Games record in the qualifying heats: 12.66.

Medalists

Records

Results

See also
2003 World Championships in Athletics – Women's 100 metres hurdles
Athletics at the 2004 Summer Olympics – Women's 100 metre hurdles

Notes

References
Results

Hurdles, Women's 100
2003
2003 in women's athletics